Robert O'Shea (born 20 July 1993) is an Irish hurler who plays as a midfielder for the Cork senior team.

Born in Carrigaline, County Cork, O'Shea first played competitive hurling and Gaelic football whilst a pupil at Carrigaline Community School. He arrived on the inter-county scene at the age of sixteen when he first linked up with the Cork minor team, before later lining out with the under-21 and intermediate sides. He made his senior debut in the 2013 Waterford Crystal Cup. O'Shea was later included on Cork's championship team as a substitute.

At club level O'Shea plays with Carrigaline.

Career statistics

Club

Inter-county

Honours

Carrigaline Community School
Munster Colleges' Senior "C" Hurling Championship (1): 2011
Cork Colleges' Senior Hurling Championship (2): 2011, 2012

University College Cork
All-Ireland Freshers' Hurling Championship (1): 2013

References

1993 births
Living people
UCC hurlers
Carrigaline hurlers
Carrigdhoun hurlers
Cork inter-county hurlers